The 2013 USL Premier Development League season was the 19th season of the PDL. The regular season began on May 4 with 3 matches and ended on July 21 with 9 matches.  The regular season was followed by a postseason tournament of conference winners to determine the league's champion. Four teams were added to the league and 13 teams dropped, bringing the total number of teams in the league to 64 for 2013.

Changes from 2012

Name changes 
 Hamilton FC Rage rebranded as K-W United FC
 Bradenton Academics rebranded as IMG Academy Bradenton
 New Jersey Rangers rebranded as NJ-LUSO Rangers FC
 Palmetto FC Bantams rebranded as SC United Bantams
 VSI Tampa Flames rebranded as VSI Tampa Bay FC (PDL)
 Pali Blues rebranded as OC Blues Strikers FC
 Texas Dutch Lions rebranded as Houston Dutch Lions

New teams 
Four new clubs joined the PDL this coming season.

Folding/moving 
Thirteen teams were announced as leaving the league prior to the beginning of the season: 
 Boston Victory S.C. – Quincy, Massachusetts
 Bermuda Hogges – Pembroke, Bermuda
 Brooklyn Knights – Maspeth, New York
 Cincinnati Kings – Cincinnati, Ohio
 FC Jax Destroyers – Jacksonville, Florida
 Fraser Valley Mariners – Abbotsford, British Columbia
 Fredericksburg Hotspur – Fredericksburg, Virginia
 Nashville Metros – Nashville, Tennessee
 New Orleans Jesters - New Orleans, Louisiana - left to join National Premier Soccer League
 Ogden Outlaws – Ogden, Utah
 Orange County Blue Star – Irvine, California
 Real Maryland F.C. – Rockville, Maryland
 Worcester Hydra – Worcester, Massachusetts

Standings
2013 Premier Development League standings.

Note: The first tie-breaker in PDL standings is head-to-head results between teams tied on points, which is why some teams with inferior goal differences finish ahead in the standings.

Central Conference

Great Lakes Division

Heartland Division

Eastern Conference

Mid Atlantic Division

Northeast Division

South Atlantic Division

Southern Conference

Mid South Division

Southeast Division

Western Conference

Northwest Division

Southwest Division

Conference Championships

Divisional Playoffs
Five of the divisions have additional matches in order for teams to qualify for the conference championship.

In the Great Lakes Division, the 2nd and 3rd place teams qualify for a play-in match. Winner advances with the 1st place team to the conference final four.

In the Northwest Division, the 2nd and 3rd place teams qualify for a play-in match. Winner advances with the 1st place team to the conference final four.

In the Eastern Conference, the 1st place team in the Mid-Atlantic Division automatically qualifies for the conference final four. The 2nd and 3rd place teams in the Mid-Atlantic Division and the 1st and 2nd place teams in the Northeast Division and the South Atlantic Divisions play each other to qualify for the conference final four.

Eastern Conference Championship

Central Conference Championship

Southern Conference Championship

Western Conference Championship

Playoff Bracket

PDL Championship

Semi-finals

Championship

Awards
 Most Valuable Player: Kris Tyrpak, (AUS)
 Young (U21) Player of the Year: Pete Caringi (BAL)
 Coach of the Year: Paul Dalglish, (AUS)
 Goalkeeper of the Year: Chad Bush, (OTT)

All-League and All-Conference Teams

Eastern Conference
F: Pete Caringi (BAL) *, Carl Haworth (OTT) *, Dwayne Reid (OCN)
M: Brandt Bronico (CAR), Brayan Martinez (JER), Jason Plumhoff (REA) *
D: Shaun Foster (OTT), Damion Lowe (REA) *, Gilbert Manier (GPP), Hugh Roberts (BAL)
G: Chad Bush (OTT) *

Central Conference
F: Moses Danto (WSA), Oliver Gore (RCO), Zach Steinberger (MIB)
M: Bryan Ciesiulka (CHI), Jordan Green (KCB), Matt Walker (MIB)
D: Brandon Fricke (DSM) *, Tyler Hemming (LON), Nolan Intermoia (THU), Axel Sjöberg (THU) *
G: Tyson Farago (WSA)

Western Conference
F: Niall Cousens (VAN), Brett Levis (VIC), Tyler Reinhart (FRE)
M: Zach Barnes (POR), Paul Islas (FRE) *, Bobby Jhutty (VAN) *
D: Derrick Bassi (VAN), Chris Brundage (SEA), Tyler Hughes (VIC), Trevor Spurgeon (FRE)
G: David Meves (POR)

Southern Conference
F: Adam Black (OKC), Tyler Blackwood (ORL), Kris Tyrpak (AUS) *
M: Itode Fubara (ORL), Jack McVey (TAM), Tony Rocha (AUS)
D: Taian de Souza (PAN) *, Max Gunderson (AUS), Walter Kromholz (HOU), Felipe Souza (LAR)
G: Devin Cook (AUS)

* denotes All-League player

See also 
 2013 Vancouver Whitecaps FC season

References 

2013
4